WZLF (107.1 FM, "95.3 and 107.1 The Wolf") is a radio station licensed to serve Bellows Falls, Vermont transmitting from Alstead, New Hampshire. The station is owned by Binnie Media.  It airs a country music format, simulcast with WXLF (95.3 FM) in Hartford.

The station has been assigned these call letters by the Federal Communications Commission since March 1, 2005.

History
The station signed on in 1981 as WTIJ, a religious station owned by Brian Dodge. WTIJ was sold in 1983 to local residents Brad and Evelyn Weeks, who flipped it to country as WBFL. Dodge's mother Etta, owned WBFL's translator station in Keene, New Hampshire, W288AM (105.5 FM). On January 1, 1990, WBFL flipped again to classic rock as "B-107". That format, despite ratings success, was not profitable and ended two years later, and signaled the end of locally originated programming on 107.1. The station struggled into the mid 1990s with an adult album alternative format, then a simulcast of Marlboro station WSSH as WZSH until 1996 under new owner Dynacom. That was followed by country simulcasting under Dynacom and Vox, then Nassau Broadcasting Partners.

WZLF, along with 16 other Nassau stations in northern New England, was purchased at bankruptcy auction by WBIN Media Company, a company controlled by Bill Binnie, on May 22, 2012. Binnie already owned WBIN-TV in Derry, New Hampshire. The deal was completed on November 30, 2012.

References

External links

ZLF
Country radio stations in the United States
Radio stations established in 1981